Breia is a frazione of Cellio con Breia in the Province of Vercelli in the Italian region Piedmont, located about  northeast of Turin and about  north of Vercelli.

References

 

Cities and towns in Piedmont
Frazioni of the Province of Vercelli
Cellio con Breia